Purna Prasad Rajbansi is a Nepalese politician, belonging to the Communist Party of Nepal (Maoist Centre) (CPN[M]). In April 2008, as a member of the CPN(M) party, at that time known as the Communist Party of Nepal (Maoist), he won the Jhapa-3 seat in the Constituent Assembly election with 16685 votes, defeating the Home Minister Krishna Prasad Sitaula. Some time after 2009, in the breakup and merging of various communist parties in Nepal, he was a member of the Unified Communist Party of Nepal (Maoist). This party later merged with other breakaway and minor parties and reunified as the Communist Party of Nepal (Maoist Centre) in 2016.

References

Year of birth missing (living people)
Living people
Communist Party of Nepal (Maoist Centre) politicians
Nepalese atheists
Members of the Provincial Assembly of Koshi Province

Members of the 1st Nepalese Constituent Assembly